The 2012 United States Senate election in California took place on November 6, 2012, concurrently with the 2012 U.S. presidential election as well as other elections to the United States Senate and House of Representatives and various state and local elections.

The primary election on June 5 took place under California's new blanket primary law, where all candidates appear on the same ballot, regardless of party. In the primary, voters voted for any candidate listed, or write-in any other candidate. The top two finishers—regardless of party—advanced to the general election in November, even if a candidate managed to receive a majority of the votes cast in the June primary. In the primary, less than 15% of the total 2010 census population voted. Incumbent Democratic U.S. Senator Dianne Feinstein announced her intention to run for a fourth full term in April 2011 and finished first in the blanket primary with 49.5% of the vote. The second-place finisher was Republican candidate and autism activist Elizabeth Emken, who won 12.7% of the vote.

Feinstein ultimately defeated Emken in the general election on November 6, winning 62.5% of the vote to Emken's 37.5%.  Feinstein's total of 7.86 million popular votes is the most ever received by a candidate for U.S. Senate in American history. For a full decade, Emken was the only Republican candidate to have advanced to a general U.S. Senate election in California, as only Democratic candidates advanced to the general election in 2016 and 2018; however, this streak was broken in 2022.

Primary

Candidates

Democratic Party 
 Dianne Feinstein, incumbent U.S. senator
 Colleen Shea Fernald
 David Levitt, computer scientist and engineer
 Nak Shah, environmental health consultant
 Diane Stewart, businesswoman
 Mike Strimling, attorney and former U.S. Peace Corps legal adviser

Republican Party 
 John Boruff, businessman
 Oscar Alejandro Braun, businessman and rancher
 Greg Conlon, businessman and CPA
 Elizabeth Emken, candidate for the 11th congressional district in 2010
 Rogelio Gloria, U.S. Naval Officer
 Dan Hughes, businessman
 Dennis Jackson
 Dirk Konopik, former congressional aide
 Donald Krampe
 Robert Lauten
 Al Ramirez, businessman
 Nachum Shifren, rabbi and state senate candidate in 2010
 Orly Taitz, dentist, Birther movement activist and candidate for California Secretary of State in 2010
 Rick Williams, business attorney

Libertarian 
 Gail Lightfoot, retired nurse

Peace and Freedom 
 Kabiruddin Karim Ali, businessman
 Marsha Feinland, retired teacher

American Independent 
 Don J. Grundmann, chiropractor
Despite Don J. Grumann running, The American Independent Party gave their party endorsement to Republican Robert Lauten.

Polling

Results

Election contest 
In July 2012, Taitz sued to block the certification of the primary election results, alleging "rampant election fraud", but her suit was denied.

General election

Fundraising

Top contributors

Top industries

Candidates 
 Dianne Feinstein (D), incumbent U.S. Senator
 Elizabeth Emken (R), former Vice President of Autism Speaks

Debates 
No debates were scheduled. Senator Feinstein decided to focus on her own campaign rather than debate her challenger.

Predictions

Polling

Results

Results by county

See also 
 2012 United States Senate elections
 2012 United States House of Representatives elections in California

References

External links 
 Elections at Secretary of State of California
 Campaign contributions at OpenSecrets.org
 Outside spending at the Sunlight Foundation
 Candidate issue positions at On the Issues

Official campaign sites (Archived)
 Elizabeth Emken for Senate
 Dianne Feinstein for Senate

2012
California
U.S. Senate